Vince Coleman may refer to:

Vince Coleman (train dispatcher) (1872–1917), Canadian train dispatcher killed in the Halifax Explosion
Vince Coleman (baseball) (born 1961), American baseball player

See also
Vincent Coleman (1900–1971), American actor